Kamkin is a surname and may refer to:

 Aleksey Kamkin (born 1952), retired Russian rower who had his best achievements in the coxless fours
 Mikhail Kamkin (born 1985), Russian professional football player

See also
Victor Kamkin Bookstore, retail book shop with a main location in Rockville, Maryland
Kakin
Kamiakin (disambiguation)

Russian-language surnames